Stephanodoria is a genus of Mexican plants in the tribe Astereae within the family Asteraceae.

Species
The only known species is  Stephanodoria tomentella, native to San Luis Potosí in northeastern Mexico.

References

Monotypic Asteraceae genera
Astereae
Flora of San Luis Potosí